Gabor G. Gyukics (born May 9, 1958) is a Hungarian American poet and literary translator. He is known for translating American poetry to Hungarian and Hungarian poetry to English. Gabor G. Gyukics is a member of the Szépírók Társasága – Hungarian Society of Writers, Critics and Literary Translators

Life
Gyukics was born in Hungary in 1958. He left Hungary for Holland in 1986. In 1988, he moved to the U.S., where he worked until moving back to Budapest in 2002.

Career
Gyukics was the founder of a series of open poetry readings combined with jazz in Hungary starting in1999. His current work focuses on translations of Native American poetry and American poetry.				
Gyukics and Michael Castro used to collaborate on translations of contemporary poems from Hungarian to English between 1989 and 2000. Together, they also translated the poetry of Attila József.

Prizes and fellowships 
 Hungary Beat Poet Laureate (Lifetime), National Beat Poetry Foundation, Wolcott, Connecticut, 2020
 Milán Füst translation fellowship, Hungarian Academy of Science, Budapest 1999, 2017
 Poesis 25 Prize for Poetry, Satu Mare, Romania 2015
 Salvatore Quasimodo Special Prize for Poetry, Balatonfüred, Hungary 2012
 ArtsLink Project Award, New York 1999

Book fairs and festivals 
 International Book Festival Budapest, 2000, 2022
 Elba Poetry Festival, Elba, Italy, 2022
 National Beat Poetry Festival, Pleasant Valley/Barkhamsted, Connecticut, USA, 2021
 Prague International Literary Festival, Prague, Czech Republic, 2019
 Cairo International Book Fair, Cairo, Egypt, 2019
 ProtimluvFest International literary festival, Ostrava, Czech Republic, 2017 
 Tanta International Poetry Festival, 2nd Edition, Tanta, Egypt, 2016
 The 1st 100 Thousand Poets for Change Festival, Salerno, Italy 2015
 The 25th Poesis Poetry Festival, Satu Mare, Romania 2015
 The 10th Novi Sad International Literary Festival, Novi Sad, Serbia 2015
 Sofia International Book Fair, Sofia, Bulgaria 2013
 The 12th 'Den poezie' Festival, Prague, Czech Republic 2010
 Cúirt International Festival of Literature, Galway, Ireland 2004  
 Culture of Wine Festival in Sofia, Bulgaria 2000
 Blue Metropolis Montreal International Literary Festival, Canada 2000

Original poetry
 Utcai Elődás, poetry in Hungarian, Fekete Sas Publishing, Budapest, 1998; 
 Last Smile, English-Hungarian, Cross Cultural Communications, New York, 1999, Preface by Hal Sirowitz; 
 A remete többes száma, poetry in Hungarian, Fekete Sas Publishing, Budapest, 2002; 
 versKÉPzelet, poetry and writings on art in Hungarian and 22 works by 20 contemporary fine artists, Hanga Publishing, Budapest, 2005; 
 Lepkék vitrinben, poetry in Hungarian,  Fekete Sas Publishing, Budapest, 2006; 
 kié ez az arc, poems in Hungarian, L’Harmattan Publishing, Budapest, 2011; 
 Selected Poetry of Gabor Gyukics in Bulgarian, translated by Stefka Hrusanova, Gutenberg Publishing House, Sofia, Bulgaria, 2013; 
 A Hermit Has no Plural, poems in English, Singing Bone Press, Columbia, SC, USA 2015; 
 végigtapint selected poetry in Hungarian, Lector Publishing, Târgu Mureș, Romania,2018; 
 kié ez az arc, poems in Arabic, translated by Abdallah Naggar, Sanabel, Cairo, Egypt 2019; 
 kié ez az arc, poems in Czech, translated by Robert Svoboda, Protimluv Press, Ostrava, Czech Republic 2019

Original prose
 "Kisfa galeri «socio-horror»", in Hungarian, L’Harmattan Publishing, Budapest, 2014

Translations
 Half-Naked Muse / Félmeztelen múzsa, Contemporary American Poetry Anthology, bilingual, Budapest, Magyar Könyvklub Publishing 2000; 
 Swimming in the Ground, Contemporary Hungarian Poetry Anthology in English,  Neshui Publishing, St. Louis, USA, 2002 Co-translator: Michael Castro;  
Gypsy Drill, Collected poems of  Attila Balogh in English, Neshui Publishing, St. Louis, USA, 2005 Co-translator: Michael Castro
Consciousness,  Attila József DVD English version, Petőfi Literary Museum, 2005 Budapest
A Transparent Lion, Selected poetry of Attila József in English, Green Integer Publishing, 2006 Los Angeles, USA, Co-translator: Michael Castro; 
Átkelés, Contemporary American Poetry Anthology in Hungarian, Nyitott Könyvműhely, 2007 Budapest; 
A szem önéletrajza, Selected poetry of Paul Auster in Hungarian, Barrus Publishing, 2007 Budapest;
Cornucopion / Bőségszaru, Selected poetry of Ira Cohen in Hungarian, I.A.T. and Új Mandátum Publishing, 2007 Budapest; 
Nagy Kis-Madár, the poetry of Jim Northrup, Új Forrás and Librarius Publishings, 2013 Tata, Hungary;
My God, How Many Mistakes I've Made, Selected poetry of Endre Kukorelly, co - translator Michael Castro, Singing Bone Press, USA 2015; 
Medvefelhő a város felett, Contemporary Native American poetry anthology in Hungarian, Budapest, Scolar Publishing, 2015, 
The Heart Attacks of the Soul, Gypsy Cantos, selected poetry of Attila Balogh, co-translator Michael Castro, Singing Bone Press, Charleston, SC, USA, 2018 
"They'll be Good for Seed", Contemporary Hungarian Poetry Anthology in English, White Pine Press, Buffalo, USA, 2021; 
 Viselnéd a szemem, American Poetry and Prose in Hungarian, Károli University Press - L'Harmattan Publishing, 2021 Budapest ISBN 978-963-414-809-8
"Shelter Under the Sun", Poetry of Three Hungarian Women in English, Singing Bone Press, Columbia, SC, USA, 2021; 
"Nélkülözhetetlen Allen Ginsberg, Hungarian editor and translator et al. of the Hungarian version of Essential Allen Ginsberg,Europa Publishing House, Budapest, ISBN 978 963 504 623 2

CDs
 Vibration of Words, jazz poetry in English, Origo Studio, Budapest, 2018. Music: Ágoston Béla soprano and C melody saxophones, alto clarinet, kaval, glissonic, fijura, Bori Viktor piano, Pengő Csaba double bass, Gabor G Gyukics poetry
 Beépített arcok, jazz poetry in Hungarian, Origo Studio, Budapest, 2018. Music: Ágoston Béla soprano and C melody saxophones, alto clarinet, kaval, glissonic, fijura, Bori Viktor piano, Dóra Attila soprano saxophone, bass clarinet, Eichinger Tibor guitar, Gabor G Gyukics poetry 
 Sand Snail, English language poetry;  Frogpond Productions, New York, 2000. Music: Mark Deutsch. Guest Poet:  Nagy Imola Borzos

Exhibition
The Afterlife of a Book; the poetry of Gábor G. Gyukics with the eyes of contemporary fine artists, 15 poems –19 artists – 21 artworks, Mucius Gallery, Budapest April 11- May 12, 2005
Versvonzatok; the poetry of Gábor G. Gyukics with the eyes of contemporary fine artists. 21 poems – 21 artists – 25 artworks, Petőfi Literary Museum, Budapest, December 4, 2018- January 20, 2019

Magazines
Látó literary magazine American issue 2006/5; guest editor, translator

References

Hungarian male poets
American male poets
Hungarian translators
Living people
1958 births
20th-century Hungarian poets
21st-century Hungarian poets
20th-century American poets
21st-century American poets
20th-century American male writers
21st-century American male writers